Xiongxian Township (Mandarin: 雄先藏族乡) is a township in Hualong Hui Autonomous County, Haidong, Qinghai, China. In 2010, Xiongxian Township had a total population of 8,233: 4,386 males and 3,847 females: 1,864 aged under 14, 5,955 aged between 15 and 65 and 414 aged over 65.

References 

Township-level divisions of Qinghai
Haidong
Ethnic townships of the People's Republic of China